Caney Creek (Matagorda Bay) is a river in Texas that begins northwest of Wharton, flows generally southeast, and empties into the Gulf of Mexico near Sargent. The major waterway to the west is the Colorado River while the next major waterway to the east is the San Bernard River.

Geography
Caney Creek rises 1 mile south of Matthews in Colorado County "within the maze of irrigation canals, dead-water sloughs, and old stream channels" at the northern edge of Wharton County. Thousands of years ago, the Colorado River flowed through the Caney Creek channel before diverting into its present course. The creek's wide meanders identify it as a very old stream. Caney Creek is intermittent until the Matagorda County line when other streams empty into it, making it a continuously flowing waterway. The land along the stream is farmed for rice and cotton or used for cattle ranching.

After passing through Wharton, Caney Creek runs east and southeast on the south side of FM 1301. The stream runs through Boling-Iago then goes south along FM 1301 to Pledger. From there, Caney Creek flows in a southerly direction on the west side of FM 1728 and passes to the east of Van Vleck. The creek runs south through Allenhurst and passes east of Caney. From there to its mouth, the stream follows FM 457. Caney Creek flows southeast past Cedar Lane where Linnville Bayou joins it just below the FM 521 bridge. The creek turns south and passes through Hawkinsville and Sargent on its way to the Gulf of Mexico. It first intersects the Intracoastal Waterway before emptying into the Gulf and East Matagorda Bay.

Caney Creek Tidal, Caney Creek above Tidal, San Bernard River, Linnville Bayou, Hardeman Slough, and Live Oak Bayou are streams within the Brazos-Colorado Coastal Basin. The Texas Commission on Environmental Quality and the Environmental Institute of Houston (part of University of Houston–Clear Lake) maintain water quality monitoring stations on the Caney Creek and Linnville Bayou watersheds.

History
Caney Creek was first called Canebrake Creek because it had thick cane growth along its banks in the days before Anglo settlers cleared it away. The rich alluvial soil along the creek was noted by surveyor Elias R. Wightman who was one of the Old Three Hundred. His report attracted Anglo-American settlers in the 1820s. Typically, Stephen F. Austin's colonists burned the canebrake to help enrich the soil. Sugar production became so successful that soon large homes were built so that one area was known as Plantation Row. In 1825, Robert Harris Williams was supposed to have built the first cotton gin in Texas along the banks of Caney Creek. During the American Civil War the local Confederate commander John B. Magruder fortified the mouth of Caney Creek, and in January and February 1864 these defenses repelled a Federal naval attack. When no Union soldiers appeared, the 4,000–6,000 Confederate defenders were moved to other locations.

Notes

References

See also
List of rivers of Texas
USGS Hydrologic Unit Map - State of Texas (1974)

Rivers of Texas
Rivers of Matagorda County, Texas
Rivers of Wharton County, Texas